Prioritise Pleasure is the second studio album by the British musician Self Esteem, aka Rebecca Lucy Taylor, released on 22 October 2021. The album was nominated for the 2022 Mercury Prize.

Critical reception 

Prioritise Pleasure received widespread acclaim from music critics. At Metacritic, which assigns a normalised rating out of 100 to reviews from mainstream critics, the album has an average score of 92, based on 12 critical reviews, indicating "universal acclaim".

In a five-star review, The Guardian reviewer Laura Snapes described the album as "remarkable" and "a rare big pop album after 18 months of comparatively diminutive offerings from headline female pop acts". El Hunt in NME called it "assured and unapologetic" and "charged with a dark, smirking wit that's impossible to turn away from". Jessie Atkinson of Gigwise concluded that Prioritise Pleasure "represents Rebecca Taylor reaching her well-deserved pinnacle, as a modern popstar with the whole package: voice, humour, choreography, honesty, looks and the uncanny ability to pen a banger".

Accolades 
The Guardian, The Sunday Times, the i and Gigwise ranked Prioritise Pleasure as the best album of 2021. NME and The Independent ranked the album as the fourth best of 2021. The Guardian named "I Do This All the Time" as the best song of 2021.

A BBC News "poll of polls" that combined the results of 30 critics' end-of-year lists placed Prioritise Pleasure at number seven for 2021. A Metacritic collection of 182 year-end top ten lists by music publications placed the album at number 12 for the year.

Track listing

Charts

References 

2021 albums